Malt liquor is a type of mass market beer with high alcohol content, most closely associated with North America. Legally, it often includes any alcoholic beverage with 5% or more alcohol by volume made with malted barley. In common usage, it refers to beers containing a high alcohol content, generally above 6%, which are made with ingredients and processes resembling those for American-style lagers.

Manufacture
Malt liquor is a strong lager or ale in which sugar, corn or other adjuncts are added to the malted barley to boost the total amount of fermentable sugars in the wort.  This gives a boost to the final alcohol concentration without creating a heavier or sweeter taste. Also, they are not heavily hopped, so they are not very bitter.

Brewing and legal definitions
Malt liquor is typically straw to pale amber in color. While traditional premium lager is made primarily from barley, water, and hops, malt liquors tend to make much greater use of inexpensive adjuncts such as corn, rice, or dextrose. Use of these adjuncts, along with the addition of special enzymes, results in a higher percentage of alcohol than an average beer. Higher alcohol versions, sometimes called "high-gravity" or just "HG", may contain high levels of fusel alcohols, which gives off solvent- or fuel-like aromas and flavors.

Owing to inconsistencies in American alcoholic beverage regulations, which can vary from state to state, the term "malt liquor" lacks a stable definition. In some states, malt liquor refers to any alcoholic beverage made by fermenting grain and water; in these states a non-alcoholic beer may also be called a non-alcoholic or non-intoxicating malt liquor. In some states, products labeled "beer" must fall below a certain alcohol content, and beers that exceed the mark must be labeled as "malt liquor". While ordinary beers in the United States average around 4-5% alcohol by volume, malt liquors typically range from 6% up to 9% alcohol by volume. A typical legal definition is Colorado's Rev. Stat. ss. 12-47-103(19), which provides that:

"Malt Liquors" includes beer and shall be construed to mean any beverage obtained by the alcoholic fermentation of any infusion or decoction of barley, malt, hops or any other similar products, or any combination thereof, in water containing more than three and one fifth percent of alcohol by weight.

Alcohol percentages measured by weight translate into larger figures when re-expressed as alcohol percentages by volume, because ethanol is less dense than water.

History
The term "malt liquor" is documented in England in 1690 as a general term encompassing both beer and ale. The first mention of the term in North America appears in a patent issued by the Canadian government on July 6, 1842, to one G. Riley for "an improved method of brewing ale, beer, porter, and other maltliquors."

The Clix brand is often credited as the first malt liquor made in the United States, granted a patent in 1948.  The first widely successful malt liquor brand in America was Country Club, which was produced in the early 1950s by the M. K. Goetz Brewing Company in St. Joseph, Missouri.

Other popular contemporary brands include Colt 45, St. Ides, Mickey's, Steel Reserve, King Cobra, and Olde English 800.

Advertising

The core market for malt liquor brewers in the United States in recent decades has been the Black and Hispanic populations. Brewers' use of target marketing in advertising malt liquor primarily to young, inner-city, black males has been controversial, due to the drink's higher alcohol content and the perceived vulnerability of the target audience. Brewers and advertisers have stated that they simply advertise to those who already buy their products. Critics have objected to the targeting of a segment of the population suffering disproportionately from alcohol-related disease and poor access to medical care.

In order to highlight the potency of malt liquor, brand names have stressed powerful imagery such as Colt 45, Big Bear, and Power Master, and used slogans such as "It's got more" or "The Real Power". Power and sexual dominance have been common themes in advertising. Ads for Power Master were eventually banned in the United States due to regulations against advertising the strength of alcoholic beverages.

The National Institute on Alcohol Abuse and Alcoholism (NIAAA) has reported that African Americans suffer disproportionate rates of cirrhosis of the liver and other alcohol-related health problems. In light of such statistics, African-American community leaders and some health officials have concluded that targeting high-alcohol beverage ads at this segment of the population is unethical and socially irresponsible. In 1991, U.S. Surgeon General Antonia Novello criticized all alcoholic beverage companies for "unabashedly targeting teenagers" with "sexual imagery, cartoons, and rock and rap music" in television and print ads.

Container size
In the American vernacular, a forty-ounce or simply a forty is a glass or plastic bottle that holds  of malt liquor. Malt liquors are commonly sold in 40 fluid ounce bottles, among other sizes, as opposed to the standard  bottle that contains a single serving of beer, although many malt liquors are offered in various volumes.

After the introduction of 40-ounce containers, which contain roughly five standard drinks, "40s" became a favorite high of many youth in inner-city areas.

Examples of malt liquors sold in forty ounce bottles include Olde English 800, Colt 45, Mickey's, Camo 40, Black Fist, Country Club, Black Bull, Labatt Blue Dry 6.1/7.1/8.1/9.1/10.1, WildCat, Molson Dry 6.5/7.5/8.5/10.1, Private Stock, Big Bear, St. Ides, Steel Reserve 211, B40 Bull Max, King Cobra, and Hurricane. Dogfish Head Brewery has sporadically produced a high-end bottle-conditioned forty called "Liquor de Malt".

Forties are often mentioned in hip-hop and rap culture by rap stars endorsing the "40" Ounce tradition. A similar trend was common around the late 1990s' and early 2000s' punk scene, with such songs as "40.oz Casualty" by The Casualties, "Rock the 40. Oz." by Leftöver Crack, and "40oz. to Freedom" by Sublime.

At least for a brief period in the mid-1990s, some brands of malt liquor, including Olde English 800, Colt 45, and Mickey's, were available in even larger, 64-ounce glass bottles.

International
American malt liquor brands are rarely exported to Europe.

American-style malt liquors were made in Britain in the late 1970s and early 1980s. Some were American brands brewed under license, notably Colt 45; some were not. They were generally 5% ABV. They were heavily marketed but failed in the market.

However, similar inexpensive high-alcohol beers are available.

In Italy, beers with more than 14.5 Plato degrees fall into a distinct tax rate known as "Birra doppio malto". Brewing companies often state this classification on the label. Therefore, the "doppio malto" indication nearly always identifies a beer that is the rough equivalent strength of a North American malt liquor.

See also
 Flavored fortified wines
 Barley wine

References

External links

Database of 40s

Beer styles
Liquor
Alcoholic drinks